Gardnos is a small village in Nesbyen municipality, Buskerud, Norway.

Gardnos is on Norwegian National Road 7 midway between Nesbyen and Gol. It is mainly known as the site of the Gardnos crater. Gardnos Meteorite Center (Gardnos Meteorittpark) is open to the public with guided tours provided during summer months.

References

External links
Gardnos Meteorittpark

Villages in Buskerud
Nes, Buskerud